"Two-Bit Manchild" is a song written and performed by Neil Diamond. It appears on Neil's 1968 album Velvet Gloves and Spit, and was released as an A-side with a B-side of "Broad Old Woman (6 a.m. Insanity)". It is a "strong and interesting" song according to Robert Jamieson.

"Two-Bit Manchild" also appears on the Neil Diamond compilation albums Glory Road 1968-1972, Play Me: The Complete Uni Studio Recordings Plus, Gold, and Reflections.

Reception
Allmusic recommends "Two-Bit Manchild" as one of the top four songs on the album Velvet Gloves and Spit, calling it, "a fascinating adaptation of his Brill Building-era sound to a personal/introspective lyric and approach (picture the Monkees' sound melded to a singer/songwriter persona)." It has also been described as "brilliant and very Bang-ish" and a "jewel". The opening riff is also reminiscent of Day Tripper by The Beatles.

Billboard described the single as having a "driving rock groove" and called it a "powerful follow-up"
Diamond's previous single "Brooklyn Roads."  Cash Box said that it is "danceable and sales oriented" with "a touch of Latin and a fine hand-clapping support."

Debut
Neil Diamond performed "Two-Bit Manchild" on July 2, 1968, on Showcase 68. Officially released as a 45 single in July, 1968 with the B-Side "Broad Old Woman (6 a.m. Insanity)" as UNI 55075. It eventually reached #66 on the charts.

At least two versions of the 45 sleeve were released. One featured a picture of Neil Diamond. The other featured a swirly, psychedelic graphic. It was arranged by Renzetti, Altman, Cerone, Richards and Sandler.

International release
In the United Kingdom, "Two-Bit Manchild" was also released with Broad Old Woman (6 a.m. Insanity) as the B-Side. It was released by MCA records in August 1968, and licensed by MCA INC. USA as UK MCA MU 1033. It did not chart in the U.K.

Subsequent history
The copyright has been registered twice, first as EP0000284487 on December 12, 1970, and again as RE0000772415 on January 2, 1998.

The poor chart performance of "Two-Bit Manchild" forebode the poor chart performance of Velvet Gloves and Spit. "Two-Bit Manchild" is now considered one of the "obscurities" of Neil Diamond's catalog. 
"Two-Bit Manchild" was covered by Australian pop singer Johnny Farnham on his second studio album Everybody Oughta Sing a Song released on EMI Records in November 1968. The song is now covered by the Neil Diamond coverers Nine Inch Neils, and Mike Tyler.

Non-performance on American Idol
On April 29, 2008, contestants on American Idol sang Neil Diamond penned songs. One song they did not perform was "Two-Bit Manchild". Perhaps, as New York suggested, it was too "on-the-nose." Some were "desperate" that David Cook perform it.

References

1968 songs
1978 singles
Neil Diamond songs
Songs written by Neil Diamond
Uni Records singles
Song recordings produced by Tom Catalano